This is a list of schools in Yukon, Canada. There are 28 schools in total, 14 in Whitehorse and 14 situated in the rural communities. They're each governed by a school council except for École Émilie-Tremblay, governed by Yukon's only school board, Commission scolaire francophone du Yukon. School councils are made up of locally elected and appointed members of the community who have important roles in providing advice and making decisions about some of the operation of schools.

References

Schools
Yukon
Schools